Road 31 is a road in north-west Iran in Ardabil Province. It connects Parsabad in north of province to Khalkhal. There is a project to extend the road through Alborz Mountain Range to Manjil in Gilan Province, expected to be done on 2020.

References

External links 

 Iran road map on Young Journalists Club

Roads in Iran